Dilip Kumar Saikia (1953-9 December 2016) was an Asom Gana Parishad politician from Assam. He was elected in Assam Legislative Assembly election from 1985 to 2001 from Dhemaji constituency. He was expired on 9 December 2016.

References 

Asom Gana Parishad politicians
Members of the Assam Legislative Assembly
People from Dhemaji district
2016 deaths
1953 births
Assam MLAs 1985–1991
Assam MLAs 1996–2001